Opostegoides argentisoma is a moth of the family Opostegidae. It was described by Puplesis and Robinson in 1999, and is known from Kalimantan (the Indonesian portion of the island of Borneo).

External links

Opostegidae
Moths described in 1999